Falsocacia nigromaculata is a species of beetle in the family Cerambycidae, and the only species in the genus Falsocacia. It was described by Pic in 1944.

References

Mesosini
Beetles described in 1944